Bundala is a village in Punjab, India.

Bundala may also refer to:

 Bundala National Park, National Park in Sri Lanka
 Bundala, Amritsar, a village in Amritsar District, Punjab, India

See also 
 Chak Bundala, a village in Jalandhar District, Punjab, India
 Bundela, a Rajput clan of India